Lawrence Darmani is a Ghanaian novelist, poet, and publisher.
His first novel, Grief Child, won the Commonwealth Writers' Prize as best first book from Africa in 1992.

He also writes devotional articles for Our Daily Bread, which touches the lives of many Christians around the world. He fellowships with the Presbyterian Church of Ghana.

He is editor of Step magazine and CEO of Step Publishers. 
He is married and has two daughters. They live in Accra.

Selected works
Grief Child, Lion Pub., 1991, ; iAcademic Books, 2001,  
Stories from Africa 4, African Christian Press, 1996, 
Young and Restless: Challenges facing the youth of today, Asempa Publishers, 1999,

References

External links
 Littworld.org, 23 October 2009.

Ghanaian novelists
Ghanaian male poets
Living people
People from Accra
Ghanaian publishers (people)
Year of birth missing (living people)